Per Ivarson Undi (1803 – 28 July 1860), also known as  Peter Iverson, was an early Norwegian-American homesteader in Wisconsin Territory.

Biography
Peder Ivarson was born on the Undi farm in Vik, Sogn og Fjordane, Norway. He was one of eight children born to Iver Pedersen (1762-1837) of the Gullbrå farm in Vik  and Inger Akseldtr (1775-1838) of the Skjervheim farm in Myrkdalen, a small valley in the municipality of Voss. Peder Ivarson was  married to Anna Davidsdatter from the Skjervheimm farm in Myrkdalen. Peder Ivarson, together with his wife and their children, became the first emigrants to the United States from the Sogn og Fjordane county in Norway.   His brother-in-law, brother Peder Davidsen Skjervheim,  had emigrated from Hardanger in 1837. Per Undi had also been influenced by Ole Rynning's True Account of America (Norwegian: Sandfærdig Beretning om Amerika) which was published during 1838.

The family left the community of Vik in 1839. They came on the schooner Magdalena Christina, which arrived in New York harbor July 6, 1839. The family settled in Wayne Township near the community of Wiota, known in its early history as Hamilton's Diggings in Lafayette County, Wisconsin. Peter Ivarson  was granted titled to land under the provisions of the Homestead Act on April 1, 1848.

Peter Ivarson  has been recognized as a leading force of change by both Norwegian and American historians. The significance of his immigration to America would be especially felt within the Norwegian communities of Vik and Voss. He frequently wrote letters back to friends and family in his home parish. Resulting from his efforts of persuasion, numerous families immigrated to Wisconsin including his siblings: Ragnilda, Erik, Ole and Axel Iverson.

References

Other sources
Flom, George T. (1989)  A History of Norwegian Immigration to the United States.  (Iowa City, Iowa.: Priv. Print)
Holand, Hjalmar Rued  (2006) History of the Norwegian Settlements (Decorah, Iowa: Astri My Astri Publishing) 
Lovoll, Odd Sverre  (2015)  Across the Deep Blue Sea: The Saga of Early Norwegian Immigrants (Minnesota Historical Society) 
Naeseth, Gerhard B.  (1997) Norwegian Immigrants to the United States, A Biographical Directory, 1825-1850. 2 vols. (Madison, WI: Vesterheim Norwegian-American Museum) 
Ulvestad, Martin  (1907) Nordmændene i Amerika, deres Historie og Rekord (The Norwegians in America, their History and Record). 2 vols. (translated by C. A. Clausen. Minneapolis, Minn: History Book Company's Forlag)

External links
The Official Federal Land Records Website
Vossingen, No. 2-3  Madison, Wis., July-October, 1924  (K. A. Rene, editor. Translated by Stanley J. Nuland)

1803 births
1860 deaths
People from Vik
Norwegian emigrants to the United States
People from Wiota, Wisconsin